Scopula fucata is a moth of the family Geometridae. It was described by Püngeler in  1909. It is endemic to Kyrgyzstan.

References

Moths described in 1909
fucata
Endemic fauna of Kyrgyzstan
Moths of Asia
Taxa named by Rudolf Püngeler